The woolly hare (Lepus oiostolus) is a species of mammal in the family Leporidae. It is found in western and central China, northern India, and Nepal, where its typical habitat is montane grassland. It has a wide range and is present in some protected areas but is a generally uncommon species; the International Union for Conservation of Nature has assessed its conservation status as being of "least concern".

Description
The coat is moulted just once a year.

Distribution and habitat

The woolly hare is native to Central Asia. Its range extends from northern Nepal, and Jammu and Kashmir and Sikkim in India, to western and central China, where it is present in the provinces of Gansu, Qinghai, Sichuan, Tibet, Xinjiang and Yunnan. The habitat of this hare is mainly high altitude grasslands of several types; Alpine meadows, shrubby meadows and upland cold deserts, but it also occurs in coniferous or mixed montane woodland.

Ecology
The woolly hare is a shy and usually solitary animal, and although sometimes active by day, it is mostly nocturnal. It feeds on grasses and herbs, with individual animals returning regularly at night to the same foraging areas. During the day it sometimes rests in the sun in a sheltered position. The breeding season starts in April, with two litters of between four and six young being produced each year.

Status
The woolly hare has a wide range but is a generally uncommon species, and its population is described as "very low except in a few favoured areas". It is hunted for its meat and fur, and in some areas suitable habitat is being destroyed, resulting in fragmenting of populations and the inability of individuals to make local migrations. In Nepal and China it is present in some protected areas. Overall, the International Union for Conservation of Nature has assessed its conservation status as being of "least concern" but in India it is considered "endangered".

References

Lepus
Mammals of Asia
Mammals of Nepal
Mammals of India
Mammals described in 1840
Taxonomy articles created by Polbot